Robert Crampton McCroskey (March 10, 1845 – April 10, 1922) was an American politician in the state of Washington. He served in the Washington State Senate from 1891 to 1895.

References

Democratic Party Washington (state) state senators
1845 births
1922 deaths
People from Monroe County, Tennessee
People from Whitman County, Washington